Gymnastics at the 1975 Pan American Games in Mexico City, Mexico.


Men's events

Women's events

See also
 Pan American Gymnastics Championships
 South American Gymnastics Championships
 Gymnastics at the 1976 Summer Olympics

References 
  .
 
 

1975
1975 Pan American Games